Saint George Church of Tehran, (Armenian: ,), is an Armenian Apostolic church in Tehran, Iran. It is the second oldest church in Tehran after the Church of Saints Thaddeus and Bartholomew.

Location 

It is located in Darkhungah Alley , Shahpour Avenue (fa), in the old Sangelaj (fa) neighbourhood of Tehran.

History 

During the reign of Agha Mohammad Khan Qajar, Armenians were relocated from Tbilisi and Artsakh to western parts of Tehran after his campaigns in Georgia. This church was established by two of these Armenians, Hovsepain and Stepanian, in 1795 as a small chapel. 
In 1871, an Armenian school was established beside the church and the current building of the church is from 1882.

Notable burials 

Soleiman Khan Enagolopian Saham od-Dowleh (fa) (d. 1853) – Iranian-Armenian statesman
Hakob Hovnatanian (1809–1881) – artist
Martiros Khan Davidkhanian (fa) (1843–1905) – Iranian-Armenian general

Bibliography 

 مارقوسیان، آرمینه؛ کریمیان، حسن (۱۳۸۶). «نخستین فضاهای زیستی و عبادی ارمنیان در تهران قدیم». فصلنامه فرهنگی پیمان. سال یازدهم - زمستان (۴۲)
  ژانت د. لازاریان (۱۳۸۲)، «روحانیون»، دانشنامه ایرانیان ارمنی، تهران: انتشارات هیرمند، ص. ۶۴، شابک ۹۶۴-۶۹۷۴-۵۰-۳
 هوویان، آندرانیک (۱۳۸۰). «کلیساهای ارمنیان در ایران». ارمنیان ایران. تهران: مرکز بین‌المللی گفتگوی فرنگ‌ها با همکاری انتشارات هرمس. ص. ۱۴۹–۱۴۸. شابک ۹۶۴-۳۶۳-۰۰۷-۲

See also
Iranian Armenians
List of Armenian churches in Iran

References 

Tourist attractions in Tehran
Armenian Apostolic churches in Tehran
Architecture in Iran
Buildings of the Qajar period